Bidheh Law College is a Law school situated in Madhubani in the Indian state of Bihar. It offers undergraduate 3 years LL.B. and 5 years integrated law course which is approved by Bar Council of India (BCI), New Delhi and affiliated to Bhupendra Narayan Mandal University. Bidheh Law College was established in 1977.

References

Law schools in Bihar
Universities and colleges in Bihar
Educational institutions established in 1977
1977 establishments in Bihar